Whittingstall may refer to:

Eileen Bennett Whittingstall (1907-1979), British tennis player 
Whittingstall's, former brewery in Watford, Herts, England

See also
Fearnley-Whittingstall